Le Sucre (or The Sugar) is a 1978 French crime comedy film directed by Jacques Rouffio. The film recounts a fraud case, on the basis of the speculative bubble on the price of sugar in 1974.

Plot
Raoul (Gerard Depardieu) is a hot-shot commodities broker who sweet-talks Adrien (Jean Carmet), a quiet and unassuming man, into taking his wife's inheritance and using it to speculate on the recent rise in sugar prices. Raoul is able to pry more money away from Adrien when he shows him how much his first, more conservative speculations have made. But the con-man is taken in by his own con, for Raoul has also entered the sugar market, using every bit of money he can scrape together. When the market turns around, they are both in trouble.

Cast
 Jean Carmet : Adrien Courtois
 Gérard Depardieu : Raoul-Renaud Homecourt
 Michel Piccoli : Grezillo
 Nelly Borgeaud : Hilda Courtois
 Georges Descrières : Vandelmont
 Roger Hanin : Karbaoui
 Marthe Villalonga : Madame Karbaoui
 Claude Piéplu : President Berot
 Pierre Vernier : Latoussaint
 Maurice Chevit : Lomont
 Jean-Claude Dreyfus : Mimine
 Jean-Paul Muel : Pergamont
 Tony Taffin : Flanqué
 Jean Champion

Accolades

References

External links
 

1978 films
French crime comedy films
French thriller films
Films directed by Jacques Rouffio
Films scored by Philippe Sarde
Gaumont Film Company films
1970s French films